The 2018 Major League Baseball All-Star Game was the 89th Major League Baseball All-Star Game. The game was hosted by the Washington Nationals and was played at Nationals Park on July 17, 2018. It was televised nationally by Fox. The American League beat the National League 8–6, in 10 innings.

The host city was announced on April 6, 2015, by Major League Baseball Commissioner Rob Manfred; it was the fifth All-Star Game in Washington, D.C., and the first since 1969, when the second Washington Senators hosted. It was also the first time that the Nationals had hosted the All-Star Game, and the first time that the Nationals franchise had hosted it since 1982, when the franchise played as the Montreal Expos. For the second straight year, the Houston Astros led both the American League and all of baseball in sending six All-Stars to the game.

The two leagues came into the game with identical 43–43–2 records and both had scored exactly 361 runs each in All-Star Game history. The game also broke a home run record, as ten home runs were hit in the game; the previous record being six. All but one run was scored by way of a home run. This is the second consecutive game the AL has won in the 10th inning.

The national rating for the game was 5.2, down from 6.5 in 2017.

Fan balloting

Starters
Balloting began on June 1 and ended on July 5. As in previous games, the top vote-getters at each position will be the selected starters for their respective positions, barring any suspensions, injuries or other issues. The reserve players are picked in a more convoluted way involving fan votes, players, and Commissioner's Office. For the fourth year, voting was conducted online exclusively. The results were announced on July 8.

Final roster spot
After the rosters were finalized, a second ballot of five players per league was created for the All-Star Final Vote to determine the 32nd and final player of each roster. The online balloting was conducted from July 8 through July 11. The winners of the All-Star Final Vote were Jean Segura of the American League's Seattle Mariners and Jesús Aguilar of the National League's Milwaukee Brewers.

Rosters

National League

American League

Roster notes

Trevor Bauer was named as the roster replacement for Justin Verlander due to Verlander starting on Sunday.
Yadier Molina was named as the roster replacement for Buster Posey due to injury.
Jed Lowrie was named as the roster replacement for Gleyber Torres due to injury.
Ross Stripling was named as the roster replacement for Miles Mikolas due to Mikolas starting on Sunday.
Zack Greinke was named as the roster replacement for Jon Lester due to Lester starting on Sunday.
Jeremy Jeffress was named as the roster replacement for Sean Doolittle due to injury.
Blake Snell was named as the roster replacement for Corey Kluber due to injury.
Charlie Morton was named as the roster replacement for Aroldis Chapman due to injury.
Salvador Pérez was named starter in place of Wilson Ramos due to injury.
Yan Gomes was named as the roster replacement for Wilson Ramos due to injury.
#: Indicates player would not play (replaced as per reference notes above).

Game summary

Starting lineup

Line score

See also

List of Major League Baseball All-Star Games
Major League Baseball All-Star Game Most Valuable Player Award
All-Star Futures Game
Home Run Derby

References

Further reading

External links
 

Major League Baseball All-Star Game
All-Star
Baseball in Washington, D.C.
2018 in sports in Washington, D.C.
21st century in Washington, D.C.
Sports competitions in Washington, D.C.
Major League Baseball